National Tertiary Route 725, or just Route 725 (or ) is a National Road Route of Costa Rica, located in the Alajuela province.

Description
In Alajuela province the route covers San Ramón canton (Concepción district), Naranjo canton (Naranjo, San Juan districts).

References

Highways in Costa Rica